Indazole, also called isoindazole, is a heterocyclic aromatic organic compound.  This bicyclic compound consists of the fusion of benzene and pyrazole.

Indazole is an amphoteric molecule which can be protonated to an indazolium cation or deprotonated to an indazolate anion. The corresponding pKa values are 1.04 for the equilibrium between indazolium cation and indazole and 13.86 for the equilibrium between indazole and indazolate anion.

Indazole derivatives display a broad variety of biological activities.

Indazoles are rare in nature. The alkaloids nigellicine, nigeglanine, and nigellidine are indazoles. Nigellicine was isolated from the widely distributed plant Nigella sativa L. (black cumin). Nigeglanine was isolated from extracts of Nigella glandulifera.

The Davis–Beirut reaction can generate 2H-indazoles.

Indazole, C7H6N2, was obtained by E. Fischer (Ann. 1883, 221,
p. 280) by heating ortho-hydrazine cinnamic acid,

Some derivatives
 indazole-3-carboxylic acid Having a carboxylic acid group on carbon 3. Can be further modified to lonidamine.

See also
 Indole, an analog with only one nitrogen atom in position 1.
 Benzimidazole, an analog with the nitrogen atoms in positions 1 and 3.
 Simple aromatic rings
 7-Nitroindazole, an indazole-based nitric oxide synthase inhibitor

References

 Synthesis: W. Stadlbauer, in Science of Synthesis 2002, 12, 227, and W. Stadlbauer, in Houben-Weyl, 1994, E8b, 764.
 Review: A. Schmidt, A. Beutler, B. Snovydovych, Recent Advances in the Chemistry of Indazoles, Eur. J. Org. Chem. 2008, 4073 – 4095.

 
Simple aromatic rings